The Greek Chess Championship is the major individual National Championship in Greece.

Winners

| valign="top" |
{| class="sortable wikitable"
! # !! Year !! Women's Winner
|-
| (1) || 1947 || 
|-
| 1 || 1978 || 
|-
| 2 || 1979 || 
|-
| 3 || 1980 || 
|-
| 4 || 1981 || 
|-
| 5 || 1982 || 
|-
| 6 || 1983 || 
|-
| 7 || 1984 || 
|-
| 8 || 1985 || 
|-
| 9 || 1986 ||   
|-
| 10 || 1987 || 
|-
| 11 || 1988 || 
|-
| 12 || 1989 || 
|-
| 13 || 1990 || 
|-
| 14 || 1991 || 
|-
| 15 || 1992 || 
|-
| 16 || 1993 || 
|-
| 17 || 1994 || 
|-
| 18 || 1995 || 
|-
| 19 || 1996 || 
|-
| 20 || 1997 || 
|-
| 21 || 1998 || 
|-
| 22 || 1999 || 
|-
| 23 || 2000 || 
|-
| 24 || 2001 || 
|-
| 25 || 2002 || 
|-
| 26 || 2003 || 
|-
| 27 || 2004 || 
|-
| 28 || 2005 || 
|-
| 29 || 2006 || 
|-
| 30 || 2007 || 
|-
| 31 || 2008 || 
|-
| 32 || 2009 || 
|-
| 33 || 2010 || 
|-
| 34 || 2011 || 
|-
| 35 || 2012 || 
|-
| 36 || 2013 || 
|-
| 37 || 2014 || 
|-
| 38 || 2015 || 
|-
| 39 || 2016 || 
|-
| 40 || 2017 || 
|-
| 41 || 2018 || 
|-
| 42 || 2019 || 
|-
| -- || 2020 || (not held due to Covid-19)
|-
| 43 || 2021 || 
|-
| 44 || 2022 || 
|}
|}

Multiple Winners

(+4 titles)

Open/Men's Winners

10 - 

8 -  

7 -  

4 - 

Women's Winners

9 - 

8 - 

4 - ,

References

 Lists of winners:  and 
 
 
 
 2003 results from chess.gr
 2005 results from chess.gr
 2007 results from fide.com

Chess national championships
Women's chess national championships
Chess in Greece
Chess